George Lucas Coser (born 20 February 1984), known as George Lucas, is a Brazilian professional footballer who plays as a right back.

He also holds Italian nationality.

Club career
Born in Tapejara, Rio Grande do Sul, Lucas started his professional career in 2002, as he signed a five-year contract with Grêmio Foot-Ball Porto Alegrense. After a short spell with Clube Atlético Mineiro, he moved back to Grêmio.

In July 2006, following a trial period, Lucas agreed on a one-year deal with Spain's RC Celta de Vigo. However, in only his second La Liga match, a 2–1 away win against Gimnàstic de Tarragona, he was severely injured with a broken leg, going on to miss the rest of the season as the Galicians dropped down a level.

Lucas returned to his country in July 2009, penning a one-year contract with Santos FC. He moved abroad again in the following seasons, joining S.C. Braga in Portugal; in late January 2011, however, in the following transfer window, he left the club without having appeared in competitive games, and returned to his country with Avaí Futebol Clube.

On 21 June 2011, Lucas was released by the team which sat at the bottom of the league table, eventually being relegated from the Série A. He went on to represent several sides in the following years, appearing for Sport Club do Recife and América Futebol Clube (RN) in the Série B.

In January 2017, shortly after leaving Vila Nova Futebol Clube, the 32-year-old Lucas became a players agent and also opened a barbecue restaurant in Belém. He nonetheless expressed a desire to continue playing.

References

External links
Brazilian FA database 

Futpédia profile  

1984 births
Living people
Sportspeople from Rio Grande do Sul
Brazilian people of Italian descent
Brazilian footballers
Association football defenders
Campeonato Brasileiro Série A players
Campeonato Brasileiro Série B players
Grêmio Foot-Ball Porto Alegrense players
Clube Atlético Mineiro players
Santos FC players
Avaí FC players
Ituano FC players
Sport Club do Recife players
Veranópolis Esporte Clube Recreativo e Cultural players
América Futebol Clube (RN) players
Clube do Remo players
Vila Nova Futebol Clube players
La Liga players
Segunda División players
RC Celta de Vigo players
S.C. Braga players
Brazilian expatriate footballers
Expatriate footballers in Spain
Expatriate footballers in Portugal
Brazilian expatriate sportspeople in Spain
Brazilian expatriate sportspeople in Portugal